Qereq-e Aq Qamish (also Romanized as Qereq-e Āq Qamīsh; also known as Qereq) is a village in Qaravolan Rural District, Loveh District, Galikash County, Golestan Province, Iran. At the 2006 census, its population was 336, in 66 families.

References 

Populated places in Galikash County